Sundarakul na Jolburi is a Thai family which traces its ancestry to His Highness prince Reuang, The Prince Sundarabhubet or Krom Khun (prince of the second class) Sundarabhubet of Siam. 

His Highness prince Reuang, The Prince Sundarabhubet was a Chonburi-commoner by birth, later elevated to princely status by King Phutthayotfa Chulalok (Rama I)'s royal command. He did not have royal blood, but became sworn brothers with the Front Palace Prince Maha Sura Singhanat, the king's younger brother, hence the royal grant of the Thai nobiliary particle "na". The family name was one of many formally granted by King Vajiravudh, (Rama VI, r. 1910–1925.)

Royal members of "Sundarakul na Jolburi" family 
 His Highness Prince Reuang, The Prince Sundarabhubet (Thai: พระองค์เจ้าเรือง กรมขุนสุนทรภูเบศร์)
 Chao Chom Manda Kheow Sundarakul na Jolburi, Royal Concubine of King Nangklao (Rama III) (Thai: เจ้าจอมมารดาเขียว สุนทรกุล ณ ชลบุรี)
 Mom Luang Chab Sundarakul (Thai: หม่อมหลวงจาบ สุนทรกุล)

See also 
 Chonburi Province, Thailand
 Thai royal ranks and titles

References
 หนังสือพิทยานุสรณ์ พ.ศ. 2499 
 นามสกุลพระราชทานเรียงลำดับตามอักษร
 เจ้านายที่ไม่ได้อยู่ในพระราชวงศ์จักรี
 พระบรมราโชบายขนานนามสกุล
 ประวัติศาสตร์วังท่าพระ สู่ความเป็นมหาวิทยาลัยศิลปากร

Sundarakul na Jolburi family